Kim Dam (1416–1464) was a Korean Joseon Dynasty politician, astronomer, and scientist. His nickname was Musongheon (무송헌, 撫松軒). He contributed to Korean literature, geography, and Korean lunisolar calendar calculations.

Books 
 Musongheonjip (무송헌문집, 撫松軒文集)
 Sir. Kim Mun-jeol's book (김문절공일고, 金文節公逸稿)
 Jegayeoksangjip (제가역상집, 諸家曆象集)

External links 
 Kim Dam (Naver)
 Kim Dam

1416 births
1464 deaths
15th-century Korean astronomers
Korean scientists
15th-century Korean monarchs